Belmont Abbey may be

 Belmont Abbey, France, in Belmont, Haute-Marne; a French Cistercian monastery
 Belmont Abbey, North Carolina
 Belmont Abbey, Herefordshire
 Belmont Abbey College, North Carolina